The Hyundai Creta, also known as Hyundai ix25 in China, is a subcompact crossover SUV produced by Hyundai since 2014 mainly for emerging markets, particularly BRICS. It is positioned above the Venue and below the Tucson in Hyundai's SUV line-up.

The first-generation model debuted as a near-production concept car in China in April 2014, while the second generation was first introduced in 2019. The second-generation model was also available in a longer derivative with three-row seating, which is known as the Hyundai Alcazar, Creta Grand or Grand Creta. The vehicle has been manufactured in China, India, Russia, Brazil, and Indonesia. For developed markets like South Korea, the United States, Canada, EU/EFTA/EEA countries (with the exception of the French overseas collectivities of French Polynesia and New Caledonia) and Australia, the Creta is not offered in favour of the smaller but more advanced Kona.

The model was named after the Crete island in Greece. The name is also intended to suggest connections with "creative". In the Dominican Republic, it is sold as the Hyundai Cantus.

The Creta has been the best-selling SUV in Russia since 2017. It is also the highest-selling SUV in India since 2020, and the third best-selling Hyundai model globally since 2019.



First generation (GS/GC; 2014)

Intended to be a global model for emerging markets, the vehicle debuted at the 2014 Beijing Motor Show in April 2014 in a near-production concept guise called the ix25 Concept. The production version went on sale in China in October 2014. The model was later also rolled out for production in India, where it went on sale in July 2015 as the Creta. The Creta is based on the Hyundai's new design concept called the Fluidic Sculpture 2.0.

Markets

China 
The production model had its premiere at Chengdu in August 2014, and it went on sale in China two months later. The ix25 for the Chinese market is available with 1.6-litre and 2.0-litre petrol engines mated either to a 6-speed manual or an automatic transmission. It is available with front-wheel drive or all-wheel drive.

India 
The Creta went on sale in India on 21 July 2015, produced at the Chennai plant. At launch, the Creta is available in a choice of three engines — a 1.6-litre petrol, a 1.4 or a 1.6-litre diesel from the Verna. A 6-speed manual transmission will be standard across all variants, with only the 1.6 diesel SX+ variant getting the option of a 6-speed automatic. The engine options was spread to six trim levels, which are Base, S, S+, SX, SX+ and the top-spec SX (O).

The Creta SX is also offered with a dual tone red and black or a white and black exterior color options. The SX dual tone variant is powered by a 1.6-liter gasoline or a diesel engine without any automatic transmission option.

For select trims, the Creta is equipped including Vehicle Stability Management (VSM), Electronic Stability Control (ESC), Hillstart Assist Control (HAC), Rear Parking Assist System, and ABS. The six airbag system provides all round protection. One for the driver, one for the front seat passenger, front and rear curtain airbags running the length of the cabin, plus front side airbags. Hyundai also claimed the vehicle is built with HIVE body structure, which signifies structural strength.

By November 2015, the vehicle has registered over 70,000 bookings in India and 15,770 worldwide. By August 2017, more than 200,000 Creta was sold in the country.

In 2017, the vehicle contains about 90% Indian parts.

Brazil 
The Creta was launched in Brazil in December 2016 with deliveries started in January 2017. The Brazilian Creta is produced in Piracicaba plant alongside the HB20, with the codename GSb.

Both engines are paired with 6-speed automatic transmission, with the 1.6-litre also offered with 6-speed manual transmission.

Russia 

Production of the Creta commences in Hyundai Saint Petersburg plant in August 2016 to supply Russia and other CIS markets. The assembly of the car takes place on the same production line of the plant along with the Solaris model. The model is claimed to be specially adapted for Russian conditions.

Safety

The Indian-made Creta in its most basic version for Latin America received 4 stars for adult occupants and 3 stars for toddlers from Latin NCAP in 2015.

Powertrain

Facelift 
The refreshed version was released in China in August 2017, India in May 2018, and Brazil in July 2019. It received a cosmetic update which include an updated front bumper with a large hexagonal chrome-lined grille and a new rear bumper. It also features new headlamps and tail lamps, new bumpers, and new wheel design. The Brazilian Creta also received a newly designed rear LED taillights. The Chinese version received an altered front bumper design compared to the Indian and Brazilian version.

The Russian version received a minor change in April 2020. Unlike the other Creta versions, the changes in the Russian Creta were kept minimal as the front end only received a new grille design.

Second generation (SU2; 2019) 

The second-generation model was first shown in China as the ix25 in April 2019. It was unveiled as the Creta at the 15th Auto Expo in India in February 2020. Production of the second-generation Creta in Russia started since July 2021, in Brazil since August 2021, and in Indonesia since January 2022.

Markets

China 
The second-generation ix25 was revealed during the 2019 Shanghai Auto Show in April 2019. The Chinese model (codename: SU2c) is solely powered by the 1.5-litre petrol engine producing . It went on sale in October 2019. The interior of the Chinese-market ix25 largely differ with the globally-marketed Creta as the Chinese-spec model comes with a vertical touchscreen infotainment system that flows into the central console, while the global Creta opts for a more conventional design. Production of the ix25 in China ended in 2021.

India 
Hyundai unveiled the second generation Creta in India in February 2020, and was launched to the market in March 2020. The Indian-made Creta (codename: SU2i) is a slightly modified version of on the Hyundai ix25 sold in China, with the main visual difference at the exterior being the design of the front grille. It is exported to 85 countries across Africa, Middle East, and Latin America.

In April 2022, the iMT gearbox option was released alongside the Knight Edition variant.

Russia 
The Russian market Creta (codename: SU2r) was unveiled in June 2021, sporting a revised front and rear end compared to the Indian and Chinese versions of the Creta/ix25. Trim levels offered are Prime, Classic, Family, Lifestyle and Prestige, as well as the Special Edition version. Production commenced on 1 July 2021 at the Saint Petersburg plant.

Brazil 
Production of the Brazilian market Creta (codename: SU2b) in the Piracicaba plant started in August 2021, and was officially launched afterwards. Sharing the similar exterior styling with the Russian-market Creta, the Brazilian model is powered by a 1.0-litre three-cylinder turbocharged petrol-flex engine with a power output of  along with a flagship 2.0-litre naturally aspirated petrol-flex engine producing . The N Line model was released in June 2022 with the 1.0-litre turbocharged engine.

Indonesia 
The Indonesian market Creta was unveiled at the 28th Gaikindo Indonesia International Auto Show on 11 November 2021, which sported the NX4 Tucson-inspired front fascia. Produced at the newly built Cikarang plant, the Indonesian-built Creta (codename: SU2id) is powered by the Smartstream 1.5-litre petrol engine producing . It is offered in Active, Trend, Smart, and Prime trim levels. Production started on 17 January 2022 and has been exported to several Southeast Asian markets, Middle East and Africa.

Mexico 
The second-generation Creta was launched on 10 October 2020 for the Mexican market. Imported from India, it is offered in four trim levels: GL, GLS IVT, GLS Premium, and Limited Turbo. It is offered with either a 1.5-litre petrol or a 1.4-litre turbo petrol engine and offered with either manual or automatic transmission options.

Vietnam 
The second-generation Creta was introduced in the country on 15 March 2022. It is imported from Indonesia and it will be assembled locally from 2023. The Vietnamese-market Creta is offered in three trim levels: the entry-level Standard, the mid-grade Special and the top-spec Premium, it uses the Smartstream 1.5-litre petrol engine and it will indirectly replace the Kona.

Thailand 
The second-generation Creta was introduced in the country on 17 March 2022. Imported from Indonesia, trim levels offered are SE and SEL with the Smartstream 1.5-litre petrol engine.

Philippines 
The second-generation Creta was introduced in the Philippines alongside the fourth-generation Tucson, facelifted Santa Fe and the Staria on 20 June 2022 and it became available on dealerships on 17 August 2022. It is offered in three grade levels: GL (manual and IVT), GL Limited (IVT), and the top-spec GLS (IVT), the Smartstream 1.5-litre petrol engine is standard on all grades, it replaced the petrol-powered Kona in the country.

South Africa 
The second-generation Creta was released in the country in November 2020. Imported from India, engine options available were 1.5-litre petrol, 1.4-litre turbocharged petrol and 1.5-litre diesel. The two latter were dropped when the Indian-made model was replaced by the Indonesian-made Creta in July 2022, sporting the revised front fascia styling.

Safety

The Creta in its indian specification is sold with two frontal airbags, antilock brakes, front seatbelt reminders and a tyre pressure monitor as standard equipment.  Better equipped trim levels are equipped with electronic stability control, ISOFIX anchorages, front-seat side torso-protecting seat airbags and head-protecting curtains.

Global NCAP crash-tested the Indian-market Hyundai Creta in its basic safety specification of two airbags and anti-lock brakes in H1 2022. The Creta narrowly achieved three stars for adult occupant protection in the offset deformable barrier test. Protection of the driver's head was rated only adequate.

The Creta achieved three stars for child occupant protection. It does not have ISOFIX anchorages as standard or three-point belts for all seating positions. Using the child seats Hyundai recommended for the test, dynamic performance of the 18 month-old child was good, but the 3 year-old's head moved forward excessively.

The Indonesian-made Hyundai Creta was rated 5 star in ASEAN NCAP.

Powertrain

Alcazar/Grand Creta 

In June 2021, Hyundai introduced a long-wheelbase, three-row version of the Creta as the Hyundai Alcazar in India, as the Hyundai Creta Grand in Mexico and as the Hyundai Grand Creta elsewhere. Produced in India (codename: SU2i LWB), it features a reworked front styling, 6-seater and 7-seater options, and available with a 2.0-litre Nu petrol engine or a 1.5-litre diesel engine.

Sales

References

External links

Creta
Cars introduced in 2014
2020s cars
Crossover sport utility vehicles
Mini sport utility vehicles
Front-wheel-drive vehicles
All-wheel-drive vehicles
Creta
Vehicles with CVT transmission
Global NCAP small off-road